Two naval vessels of Japan have been named Kasuga:
 , also called Kasuga Maru, a Japanese wooden paddle steamer warship of the Bakumatsu and early Meiji period
 , an armored cruiser of the Imperial Japanese Navy during the Russo-Japanese War

See also
 Kasuga-class cruiser, armored cruisers of the Imperial Japanese Navy, in commission 1904–1945
 , also called Japanese Pacific Ocean liner Kasuga Maru, a Taiyō-class escort carrier of the Imperial Japanese Navy during World War II

Imperial Japanese Navy ship names

Japanese Navy ship names